Wilson Chinn ( 1863) was an escaped American slave who became known as the subject of photographs documenting the extensive use of torture received in slavery. The "branded slave" photograph of Chinn, a former slave from Louisiana, with forehead branded with the initials of his owner, Volsey B. Marmillion, wearing a punishment collar and posing with other equipment used to punish slaves, became one of the most widely circulated photos of the abolitionist movement during the American Civil War and remains one of the most famous photos of that era. The New York Times writer Joan Paulson Gage, noted, "The images of Wilson Chinn in chains, like the one of Gordon and his scarred back, are as disturbing today as they were in 1863. They serve as two of the earliest and most dramatic examples of how the newborn medium of photography could change the course of history."

Escape and arrival at Union camp
Abolitionist, civil rights activist, and colonel in the American Civil War, George H. Hanks, wrote to George William Curtis, then editor of Harper's: "The group of emancipated slaves whose portraits I send you were brought by Colonel Hanks and Mr. Phillip Bacon from New Orleans, where they were set free by General Butler. Mr. Bacon went to New Orleans with our army, and was for eighteen months employed as Assistant-Superintendent of Freedmen, under the care of Colonel Hanks. He established the first school in Louisiana for emancipated slaves, and these children were among his pupils. He will soon return to Louisiana to resume his labor."

In an article titled “Emancipated Slaves White and Colored,” Harper’s Weekly introduces Chinn's escape from slavery: “Wilson Chinn is about 60 years old. He was ‘raised’ by Isaac Howard of Woodford Country, Kentucky. When 21 years old he was taken down the river and sold to Volsey B. Marmillion, a sugar planter about 45 miles above New Orleans. This man was accustomed to brand his negroes, and Wilson has on his forehead the letters ‘V.B.M.’ Of the 210 slaves on this plantation 105 left at one time and came into the Union camp. Thirty of them had been branded like cattle with a hot iron, four of them on the forehead, and the others on the breast or arm.”

Fanning the Anti-Slavery Cause

The former slaves, including Chinn, traveled from New Orleans to the North. Of these, four children appeared to be white or octoroon. According to the Harper's Weekly article, they were, perfectly white;' 'very fair;' 'of unmixed white race.' Their light complexions contrasted sharply with those of the three adults, Wilson, Mary, and Robert; and that of the fifth child, Isaac—'a black boy of eight years; but nonetheless [more] intelligent than his whiter companions.

The group was accompanied by Colonel Hanks from the 18th Infantry Regiment. They posed for photos in New York City and in Philadelphia. The resulting images were produced in the carte de visite format and were sold for twenty-five cents each, with the profits of the sale being directed to Major General Nathaniel P. Banks back in Louisiana to support education of freedmen. Each of the photos noted that sale proceeds would be "devoted to the education of colored people".
Most of these were produced by Charles Paxson and Myron Kimball, who took the group photo that later appeared as a woodcut in Harper's Weekly.

In January 1864, to fan the anti-slavery cause and promote the sale of abolitionist photographs, these images appeared in an article about Chinn and the child slaves published in Harper's Weekly, the most widely read journal during the Civil War.

In the 21st century, the Paxson No. 8 "branded slave" image of Chinn has appeared on display at:

 The Metropolitan Museum of Art. "Photography and the American Civil War," April 2, 2013 – September 2, 2013.
 Gibbes Museum of Art. "Photography and the American Civil War," September 27, 2013 – January 5, 2014.
 New Orleans Museum of Art. "Photography and the American Civil War," January 31, 2014 – May 4, 2014.

References

Further reading

 
 
 

African Americans in the American Civil War
American rebel slaves
Year of birth missing
Year of death missing
People notable for being the subject of a specific photograph
19th-century American slaves
History of slavery in Louisiana
African-American history of Louisiana
People of Louisiana in the American Civil War
Torture victims